Gokhan Gumussu (born 17 February 1989), is a Turkish professional footballer who plays for Türkspor Stuttgart.

References

External links
Gökhan Gümüşsu at Kicker
Gökhan Gümüşsu at FuPa

1989 births
Living people
Association football midfielders
Turkish footballers
Turkish expatriate footballers
Stuttgarter Kickers players
TSV 1860 Munich II players
1461 Trabzon footballers
Altınordu F.K. players
Darıca Gençlerbirliği footballers
Rot-Weiß Oberhausen players
SSV Reutlingen 05 players
3. Liga players
Regionalliga players
TFF Second League players